The Beltsville Speedway, formerly the Baltimore-Washington Speedway was an asphalt oval track in Prince George's County, Maryland; it spanned .

Near Beltsville, it was on land now occupied by Capitol Technology University, in the South Laurel census-designated place.

Summary
The track was specially designed with banked turns for stock car racing. Originally known as the "Baltimore-Washington Speedway", the track received its final name in its 19th month of operation. The track hosted modified stock car racing vehicles alongside the other NASCAR series. Wednesday nights were the original night for racing but the schedule eventually added Friday night racing. Ten Grand National races were raced there including the popular Beltsville 300 series of races. Strict noise restrictions were given out in its final year of operation and the county started monitoring the events. Eventually, a sound wall was built surrounding the speedways. Cars had to begin running mufflers in order to stifle the noise from the increasing RPMs from the vehicles themselves. The track was eventually shut down, demolished, and replaced with a local university.

Famous race car drivers like Richard Petty, Tiny Lund, and David Pearson participated in legendary races there. The 1968 Beltsville 300 was an example of some of the classic NASCAR Grand National races that were run on the track.

NASCAR Grand National Results

Reference:

References

Motorsport venues in Maryland
 01
Beltsville, Maryland
Buildings and structures in Prince George's County, Maryland
Defunct speedway venues in the United States
Demolished sports venues in Maryland
NASCAR tracks
Sports venues completed in 1965
Buildings and structures demolished in 1978
1965 establishments in Maryland
1978 disestablishments in Maryland